The Cruel Mistress (German: Die grausame Freundin) is a 1932 Austrian-German comedy film directed by Carl Lamac and starring Anny Ondra, Fritz Rasp and Lina Woiwode. A separate French-language version Should We Wed Them? was also released.

The film's sets were designed by Otto Erdmann and Hans Sohnle.

Cast
 Anny Ondra as Welgunda  
 Fritz Rasp as Professor Bock  
 Lina Woiwode as Frau Bock  
 Werner Fuetterer as Jim Bock 
 Olga Limburg as Jim Bocks Mutter 
 Ernst Arndt as Professor Bierbrot  
 Carl Goetz as Zirkusdirektor  
 Karl Forest as Schulinspektor  
 Dorothy Poole as Sängerin 
 Gustav Werner as Hoteldirektor 
 Hugo Thimig

References

Bibliography 
 Robert von Dassanowsky. Austrian Cinema: A History. McFarland, 2005.

External links 
 

1932 films
Austrian comedy films
Films of the Weimar Republic
German comedy films
1932 comedy films
1930s German-language films
Films directed by Karel Lamač
German multilingual films
1932 multilingual films
Austrian multilingual films
1930s German films